Veli Mitova is a South African philosopher, Professor in Philosophy and Director of the African Centre for Epistemology and Philosophy of Science (ACEPS) at the University of Johannesburg. 
She is known for her work on epistemic decolonisation and reasons for belief, in particular her view truthy psychologism.

Books
 Believable Evidence, Veli Mitova, Cambridge University Press, 2017
 The Factive Turn in Epistemology, Veli Mitova (ed.), Cambridge University Press, 2018

References

External links
Academia Profile

Living people
Fellows of the Royal Commonwealth Society
Academic staff of the University of Johannesburg
Epistemologists
Alumni of the University of Cambridge
Academic staff of the University of Vienna
Bulgarian women philosophers
South African women philosophers
Year of birth missing (living people)